The 2017 Thai League T1 (also known as the Toyota Thai League for sponsorship reasons) was the 21st season of the Thai League, the top Thai professional league for association football clubs, since its establishment in 1996. A total of 18 teams will compete in the league.  The season began on 11 February 2017. Fixtures for the 2017 season were announced on 12 January 2017.

Muangthong United are the defending champions, having won the Thai Premier League title the previous season. Thai Honda Ladkrabang,  Ubon UMT United and Port have entered as the three promoted teams from the 2016 Thai League 2.

Changes from last season

Team changes

From Thai League
Relegated to 2017 Thai League 2
 Army United
 Chainat Hornbill
 BBCU

To Thai League
Promoted from 2016 Thai Division 1 League
 Thai Honda Ladkrabang
 Ubon UMT United
 Port

Stadium changes
BEC Tero Sasana used the Boonyachinda Stadium, a change from the previous season where they used the 72nd Anniversary Stadium as their home ground in 2016.
Ubon UMT United used the UMT Stadium, a change from the previous season where they used the Tung Burapha Stadium as their home ground in 2016.

Teams
There are 18 clubs in the league, with three promoted teams from Thai League 2 replacing the three teams that were relegated from Thai League T1 following the 2016 season. All clubs that secured Thai League status for the season were subject to approval by the AFC Club Licensing before becoming eligible to participate.

Army United, Chainat Hornbill and BBCU were relegated at the end of the 2016 season after finishing in the bottom three places of the table. They were replaced by 2016 Thai League 2 champions Thai Honda Ladkrabang, 2nd place Ubon UMT United and 3rd place Port, were promoted to bring the total teams in the league to 18.

Ubon UMT United was founded in 2015, they finishing as Thai League 2 runners up in 2016, and earned promotion to the Thai League T1 for the first time in their history.

Stadium and locations

Sponsoring

Personnel
Note: Flags indicate national team as has been defined under FIFA eligibility rules. Players may hold more than one non-FIFA nationality.

Managerial changes

Foreign players

The number of foreign players is restricted to five per T1 team. A team can use four foreign players on the field in each game, including at least one player from the AFC member countries (3+1).
Note :: players who released during summer transfer window;: players who registered during summer transfer window.↔: players who have dual nationality by half-caste or naturalization.→: players who left club after registered during second leg.

League table

Standings

Positions by round

Results by match played

Results

Season statistics

Top scorers
As of 18 November 2017.

Hat-tricks

Attendance

Overall statistics

Attendance by home match played

Source: Thai League
Note: Attendances on the match SCG Muangthong United vs. Port (17 May 2017) had banned by FA Thailand.
 Attendances on the match Port vs. SCG Muangthong United (22 October 2017) had banned by FA Thailand.

See also
 2017 Thai League 2
 2017 Thai League 3
 2017 Thai League 4
 2017 Thailand Amateur League
 2017 Thai FA Cup
 2017 Thai League Cup
 2017 Thailand Champions Cup
 Thai Premier League All-Star Football
List of foreign Thai League 1 players

References

2017
2017 in Asian association football leagues
2017 in Thai football leagues